Tyndarion was a tyrant of Tauromenium (modern Taormina) in Sicily, who invited Pyrrhus over from Italy in 278 BCE. Pyrrhus directed his course first to Tauromenium, and received reinforcements from Tyndarion. (Diod. Ecl. viii. p. 495 ; comp. Plut. Pyrrh. 23; Droysen, Geschichte des Hellenismus, vol. ii. p. 150)

See also
 History of Taormina

References

Sicilian Greeks
Sicilian tyrants
People from Taormina
3rd-century BC Greek people